Rancocas may refer to the following in the U.S. state of New Jersey:

Rancocas, New Jersey, a village in Westampton Township, Burlington County
Rancocas Creek, a tributary of the Delaware River
Rancocas Farm, in Jobstown
Rancocas Valley Regional High School, in Burlington County
Rancocas Woods, New Jersey, a locality in Mount Laurel Township, Burlington County
USS Rancocas, nickname of the Vice Admiral James H. Doyle Combat Systems Engineering Development Site